Chilostoma pelia is a species of medium-sized, air-breathing, land snail, a terrestrial pulmonate gastropod mollusk in the family Helicidae, the true snails. The species is endemic to Bulgaria, and is classed as of Least-concern.

References

Chilostoma
Gastropods described in 1912